Khvosh Darreh is a village in Azghand Rural District, Shadmehr District, Mahvelat County, Razavi Khorasan Province, Iran. At the 2006 census, its population was 424, in 142 families.

References 

Populated places in Mahvelat County